The Condensed 21st Century Guide to King Crimson is a compilation by progressive rock band King Crimson, released in 2006. It contains select studio tracks from the two box sets, The 21st Century Guide to King Crimson – Volume One – 1969–1974 and The 21st Century Guide to King Crimson – Volume Two – 1981–2003.

Track listing

Disc One: In the Studio: 1969–1974

Disc Two: In the Studio: 1981–2003

Personnel

King Crimson
 Robert Fripp – guitar, Mellotron, harmonium, sleeve notes, & other devices
 Peter Sinfield – lyrics, illumination, sound and vision
 Greg Lake – bass guitar & vocals
 Ian McDonald – reeds, Mellotron, keyboards, vocals, vibraphone, woodwind
 Michael Giles – percussion, drums, back vocals
 Gordon Haskell – vocals
 Boz Burrell – bass guitar & lead vocals
 Mel Collins – sax, flute, Mellotron
 Ian Wallace – drums
 Jamie Muir – percussion
 David Cross – violin, viola & Mellotron
 Bill Bruford – percussion, drums, electronic percussion, electronic drums
 John Wetton – bass guitar & lead vocals
 Tony Levin – bass guitar, Chapman Stick & backing vocals
 Adrian Belew – guitar & lead vocals
 Trey Gunn – Warr Guitar, talker
 Pat Mastelotto – acoustic/electronic drums and percussion, drum programming

Additional personnel
 Peter Giles – bass guitar
 Keith Tippett – piano
 Robin Miller – oboe, English horn
 Marc Charig – cornet
 Richard Palmer-James – lyrics

Albums produced by Robert Fripp
2006 compilation albums
King Crimson compilation albums